Theridion logan is a species of spider in the family Theridiidae. Its Latin name refers to Logan Canyon, Utah, where the species was first discovered. The spider was discovered by two Utah State University doctoral students, Stephanie Cobbold and Lori Spears, while performing research on spider communities in Logan Canyon.

Appearance 
The spider has a black and white round body, with chevron stripes on its abdomen and spots on its top. Its appearance most closely matches Theridion rabuni.

Distribution 
Theridion logan has been discovered in three locations, all near the city of Logan, Utah: Logan Canyon, Green Canyon, and Blacksmith Fork Canyon. Although these spots are popular recreational areas, the spider does not seem to be affected by the presence of humans. Despite the limited distribution, T. logan does not appear to be in danger of extinction.

Ecology 
The species is found in sagebrush and other shrubs in its distribution area. Like most Theridiidae, it spins irregular three-dimensional webs. Prey most likely is limited to small insects. The venom of T. logan is considered harmless to humans.

References 

Theridiidae
Endemic fauna of Utah
Spiders of the United States
Spiders described in 2013